The Early Years is a 1985 compilation of music recorded by Daryl Hall & John Oates in their pre-Atlantic years.  It was originally released as an LP. Liner notes on the CD, credited to Kevin James,  provide little information on the specific source of the songs, opting instead for a generalized history of the artists' meeting at Temple University and of the bands that Hall & Oates played with during the sixties, including The Romeos, The Temptones, The Masters and Gulliver.

Track listing
"Per Kiomen" - 2:39 (Hall/Oates) [Young Ideas Publ./CBS Songs Ltd.]
"Past Times Behind" - 3:08 (Oates) [Young Ideas Publ.]
"A Lot of Changes Coming" - 3:22 (Hall) [Young Ideas Publ./CBS Songs Ltd.]
"In Honor of a Lady" - 2:25 (Hall) [Young Ideas Publ./CBS Songs Ltd.]
"Deep River Blues" - 2:41 (Oates) [CBS Songs Ltd.]
"If That's What Makes You Happy" - 2:52 (Oates) [Young Ideas Publ./CBS Songs Ltd.]
"The Provider" - 2:44 (A. Robinson) [Sanson Antobal Music Co. Inc.]
"They Needed Each Other" - 3:45 (Hall) [Young Ideas Publ./CBS Songs Ltd.]
"Angelina" - 2:43 (T. Moore) [Double Diamond Music]
"I'll Be By" - 3:06 (Oates) [CBS Songs Ltd.]
"Seventy" - 3:08 (Moore) [Double Diamond Music]

References 

1985 compilation albums
Hall & Oates compilation albums